Ba'aj (also spelt Ba'ej) is a small town in the Al-Ba'aj District of Nineveh Governorate, Iraq. The town was under control of Islamic State of Iraq and the Levant until June 2017, when Popular Mobilization Forces captured it.

It was mainly populated by Sunni Arabs.

See also
 Al-Ba'aj District

References

Populated places in Nineveh Governorate
District capitals of Iraq